Brent Raedeke (born May 29, 1990) is a Canadian-German professional ice hockey player who is currently an unrestricted free agent. He most recently played center for the Iserlohn Roosters of the Deutsche Eishockey Liga (DEL).

Playing career
He previously played with the Grand Rapids Griffins in the American Hockey League while under contract to the Detroit Red Wings of the National Hockey League. On July 24, 2013, Raedeke left the Red Wings organization after helping the Griffins claim the Calder Cup, and signed a one-year deal as a free agent with the Iserlohn Roosters of the DEL.

On April 30, 2015, after two seasons with the Roosters, Raedeke signed with fellow DEL competitors Adler Mannheim on a two-year contract.

Raedeke played five seasons in Mannheim, in winning the league in the 2018–19 season, before leaving as a free agent following the COVID-19 pandemic affected 2019–20 season.

On August 7, 2020, Raedeke returned to his original German club, the Iserlohn Roosters, in signing a one-year contract. 

Following the 2022–23 season, with Iserlohn missing the playoffs for the second consecutive year, Raedeke left the club at the conclusion of his contract on March 10, 2023.

Career statistics

Regular season and playoffs

International

Awards and honours

References

External links

1990 births
Adler Mannheim players
Brandon Wheat Kings players
Canadian ice hockey left wingers
Edmonton Oil Kings players
Grand Rapids Griffins players
Iserlohn Roosters players
Living people
Sportspeople from Regina, Saskatchewan
Canadian expatriate ice hockey players in Germany